Eleanor Elkins Widener ( Elkins, later known as Eleanor Elkins Widener Rice or Mrs. Alexander Hamilton Rice; 1937) was an American heiress, socialite, philanthropist, and adventuress best remembered for her donation to Harvard University of the Widener Librarya memorial to her elder son Harry Elkins Widener, who (along with her first husband, George Dunton Widener) perished in the sinking of the RMS Titanic.

Widener later married Harvard professor Alexander Hamilton Rice Jr., a surgeon and explorer, then accompanied him on a number of expeditions, including one on which she "went further up the Amazon than any white woman had penetrated" and, purportedly, he was attacked by cannibals.

First marriage 

Eleanor Elkins was the daughter of Philadelphia streetcar magnate William Lukens Elkins. In 1883 she married George Dunton Widener, son of her father's business partner, thereby "[uniting] two of the largest fortunes in the city. She was known as one of the city's most beautiful women."

In later marriage they lived in her father-in-law's 110-room Pennsylvania mansion, Lynnewood Hall. Their children were Harry Elkins Widener, George Dunton Widener Jr., and Eleanor Widener Dixon.

Titanic survival and Widener Library 

 and her husband traveled to Paris with their elder son Harry, in search of a chef for their new hotel, Philadelphia's Ritz Carlton. On April 10 they embarked at Cherbourg on the RMS Titanic for their return to the United States. On the night the ship sank they hosted the ship's captain, Edward Smith, at dinner in its À la Carte Restaurant.
George, Harry, and their valet all perished in the sinking, but Eleanor and her maid survived.

Soon after, Widener donated, at a cost of $3.5million (equivalent to $ million in ), the Harry Elkins Widener Memorial Library to Harvard University. (Harry Widener, who was "intensely interested in the collection of rare and valuable books", had graduated from Harvard College in 1907.) She also rebuilt St.Paul's Protestant Episcopal Church in Elkins Park, Pennsylvania as a memorial to George Widener, and gave a $300,000 science building to Pottstown, Pennsylvania's The Hill School, from which Harry Widener had graduated in 1903.

Second marriage and South American adventures 

 1915 dedication, Widener met
Harvard professor Alexander Hamilton Rice Jr., a surgeon and noted South American explorer,
a "certified Boston Brahmin" who "knew headwaters the way other society folk knew headwaiters."
In October she married Rice while wearing her "celebrated [$750,000] string of pearls which she saved from the Titanic disaster".
(Another string, worth $250,000, had been lost.
One headline read: "Explorer Weds Titanic Widow".)
She gave up her Philadelphia home, dividing her time among Newport, New York, and Paris when not accompanying Rice in his explorations.

On one such foray, Widener became "the first white woman to enter the Rio Negro country [where she] caused a great sensation among the natives. She was kindly treated and was looked upon with reverence. Natives showered her with gifts, and she made many friends with the women of the tribes by her gifts of beads, knives and other trinkets."

A 1920 trip on which Widener "went further up the Amazon than any white woman had penetrated" went less smoothly.
"The party warded off an attack by savages and killed two cannibals""scantily clad... very ferocious and of large stature"though "as luck would have it, [Widener had] remained on the specially constructed yacht" during this phase of the explorations.
That particular trip "was abandoned on the advice of Indian guides, but the Rices ventured several more times into the jungles."
(A subsequent headline read: "Explorer Rice Denies That He Was Eaten By Cannibals".)

In 1937 Widener died in a Paris store.
She left her fortune of $11 million,
with minor exceptions, to a trust for the benefit of Rice, to pass on his death to her surviving son George and daughter Eleanor.

Notes

References 
 

1860s births
1937 deaths
American expatriates in France
American philanthropists
People associated with the Philadelphia Museum of Art
People from Philadelphia
RMS Titanic survivors
Widener family